Alexander Armstrong's Big Ask is a British comedy panel show hosted by Alexander Armstrong. The pilot was shown on Dave on 30 May 2011. The guests on the pilot were Robert Webb, Katy Brand and Griff Rhys Jones. After a positive reaction to the pilot, Dave ordered a full series which was filmed in October 2011 and broadcast from 6 February 2012. A second series began 26 February 2013.

Episode list

Pilot

Series 1

Series 2

References

External links

2010s British comedy television series
2011 British television series debuts
2013 British television series endings
British comedy television shows
Dave (TV channel) original programming
British panel games
2010s British game shows
Television series by ITV Studios